Albert Vidalie (25 May 1913 – 8 June 1971) was a French writer, screenwriter, and songwriter.

Biography 
Vidalie was the son of Jeanne Deshayes, a stitcher, born à La Ville-du-Bois in the Hurepoix and Jean-Baptiste Vidalie, a printing worker, born in Mauriac, Cantal. He married Madeleine Constantin in 1936, with whom he had three daughters, Colette (1937), Danièle (1946-1948) and Isabelle (1951).

From the age of 12 he made small trades until the 39/45 war during which he was held prisoner for five years in Neusalz on Oder in Silesia. After the war, the Radiodiffusion française sought memories and poems of prisoners. He introduced himself, and thanks to two poems in slang language, he became assistant of radio series and wrote scenarios and adaptations put on air.

He also worked as a journalist for the newspaper France Dimanche.

Between 1952 and 1968, he published nine novels and short stories.

He also attended the post-war Saint-Germain-des-Prés. His friends were Roger Nimier, Kléber Haedens, Paul Guimard, and  Antoine Blondin, the godfather of his daughters. He was also close to Pierre Mac Orlan, Jean Giono, and Georges Arnaud.

He wrote cabaret shows played at the cabaret de la Rose Rouge, the Théâtre La Bruyère, at the Fontaine des 4 saisons, a cabaret directed by Pierre Prévert and wrote screenplays and dialogues for the cinema, adaptations or original texts.

 
At the end of his life he wrote two screenplays for television serials, the second of which, Mandrin, will not be released until after his death.

He lived in Châtillon during his first 23 years, then Fontenay-aux-Roses, then in the Luberon ar Reillanne near Manosque close to his friend Jean Giono. He finished his life in the 14th arrondissement of Paris.

Bibliography

Novels and collections of short stories 
1952:  C'était donc vrai
1954: The Night Heaven Fell - adapted to cinema under the éponymous title by Roger Vadim in 1958
1955: La Bonne Ferte, Éditions Denoël, Prix des libraires
1958: Chandeleur l'artiste
1959: La Belle Française
1960: Cadet la Rose
1961: Le Pont des Arts
1963: Les Verdures de l'Ouest
1968: Les Hussards de la Sorgue
2010: L'Aimable-Julie, Monsieur Charlot et Consorts -

Theatre 
 1949: Saint Parapin d'Malakoff - Play by Albert Vidalie, directed by Philippe Clair, setting by Klementieff, Théâtre de l'Œuvre, with Jean Tielment, Denise Bailly, Charles Bensoussan, Chalosse, Jean Rocherot, Josette Rateau, Colette Gambier, M. Valo.
 1949: Terror of Oklahoma, in collaboration with Yves Robert and Louis Sapin
 1953: Les Images d'Epinal, directed by Jean-Pierre Grenier, Cabaret La Fontaine des 4 Saisons of Pierre Prévert with Jean Rochefort
 1954: Les Mystères de Paris by Albert Vidalie after Eugène Sue, directed by Georges Vitaly, Théâtre La Bruyère
 1955: Les Petites Filles modèles by Albert Vidalie an Louis Sapin, directed by Jean-Pierre Grenier, Cabaret La Fontaine des 4 Saisons 
 1956: La Nuit romaine by Albert Vidalie, directed by Marcelle Tassencourt, Théâtre Hébertot with Roger Hanin

Scripts 
He wrote the scripts for:
 1951: Terreur en Oklahoma, short film directed by Paul Paviot, with Michel Piccoli
 1952: Torticola contre Frankensberg, short film directed by Paul Paviot, with Michel Piccoli
 1952: Chicago-digest,  short film directed by Paul Paviot Daniel Gélin
 1952: Poil de carotte, directed by Paul Mesnier with Raymond Souplex
 1960: Chien de pique, directed by Yves Allégret with Eddie Constantine
 1961: Le Capitaine Fracasse (film, 1961) directed by Pierre Gaspard-Huit with Jean Marais
 1962: Le Cousin de Callao, directed by Jackie Pierre with Roger Hanin
 1970: Mandrin (TV serial in 6 episodes - 1972) directed by Philippe Fourastié with Pierre Fabre.

Songs 
 Vidalie wrote numerous texts in collaboration with Jean Wiener for music. 
  (Chanson canaille, La Java mélancolique)
 Juliette Gréco (La Complainte de Sir Jack l'Éventreur, music by Yves Darriet, (1955) 
 Germaine Montero,
 Yves Montand (Actualités, music by Stéphane Golman)
  (La chanson de Jim)

Souvenir 
 The figure of Albert Vidalie is warmly evoked in the novel  by Antoine Blondin,

References

External links 
 
 Bonnes nouvelles d'Albert Vidalie on L'obs
 Les Loups d’Albert Vidalie on Lesparisdld.com 
 La bonne musique d'Albert Vidalie on La Revue Critique (11 March 2011)
 Le verbe allègre d'Albert Vidalie on Valeurs Actuelles (18 November 2010)
 Les grandes fictions de la télévision sur Ina.fr

20th-century French screenwriters
20th-century French dramatists and playwrights
Prix des libraires winners
People from Hauts-de-Seine
1913 births
1971 deaths